Rawson is a central department of San Juan Province in Argentina.

Geography
Its boundaries are: 

 To the north with the departments of Santa Lucía, and Capital Rivadavia 
 To the south with: Pocito and Sarmiento 
 To the east of the Pocito 
 In west July 9 and May 25 

Presents a relief little bumpy, almost flat with a slight decline eastwards.

The suitability of its soil has enabled the development of high-productivity agriculture, the main economic activity, which is facilitated by a network of irrigation canals by driving water from the San Juan River. Irrigation is supplemented by groundwater, which are extracted by wells electrified. In rural areas are also used wells springs.

Economy
In the department Rawson dominated the business, one of lasmás intense in the province after intense department Capital. 

It also highlights an intensive farming mainly in the district of Médano Gold, which highlights planting asparagus, onions, potatoes, apricot, plum and in the western department of numerous plantations vine. Also several hectares has been earmarked for the production horticulture and forestry. 

The Department has a Market Hub Fruits and vegetables (rather than marketing of fruit and vegetables), which is the largest in the province, the market has refrigerators and a cooperative packages and garlic exports, which makes a heavy trade in local production and National. 

With regard to industry is also intense and there are a large number of factories among the most prominent is "Fruits of Cuyo" where are manufactured preserved fruits and vegetables and also highlights several of the access route south 

Departments of San Juan Province, Argentina